Nicodim, born Nicolae Munteanu (6 December 1864, Pipirig, Neamț County, Romania – 27 February 1948, Bucharest), was the head of the Romanian Orthodox Church (Patriarch of All Romania) between 1939 and 1948.

Biography 
He studied theology at the Kiev-Mohyla Academy, Russian Empire and became a monk at Neamț Monastery in 1894.
Nicodim was supportive of the Royal Family of Romania and a notable anti-Communist, refusing to give support for the Soviet-backed Communist regime in the process of installation in Romania in 1945–1947. Immediately, rumors circulated to the effect that he had been murdered, perhaps with Soviet approval. However, all available evidence indicates the patriarch died of natural causes.

Nicodim Munteanu was buried at the Romanian Patriarchal Cathedral in Bucharest, next to the first Patriarch of Romania Miron Cristea.

Notes

External links 
 Nicodim Munteanu on the Romanian Patriarchate website

Patriarchs of the Romanian Orthodox Church
People from Neamț County
Romanian anti-communist clergy
1864 births
1948 deaths
Burials at the Romanian Patriarchal Cathedral
National University of Kyiv-Mohyla Academy alumni
Honorary members of the Romanian Academy
Romanian monarchists
Romanian anti-communists